Nizhnekalinovsky is a rural locality (a settlement) in Zhan-Aulsky Selsoviet, Kamyzyaksky District, Astrakhan Oblast, Russia. The population was 161 as of 2010.

References 

Rural localities in Kamyzyaksky District